Eerik Kumari born Erik Mathias Sits (7 March 1912 – 8 January 1984) was a biologist, and pioneer of ornithology and nature conservation in Estonia. He was born in Kirbla, Lihula Parish. He was a director of the Institute of Zoology and Botany at the Estonian Academy of Sciences during 1952–1977. He was the president of the Estonian Naturalists' Society in 1954–1964.

The Eerik Kumari Award was established in 1989 in his name to honor those who have excelled in biology in Estonia.

References
 Eerik Kumari memorial collection

Estonian ornithologists
University of Tartu alumni
1912 births
1984 deaths
People from Lääneranna Parish
Members of the Estonian Academy of Sciences
20th-century Estonian scientists
Academic staff of the Estonian University of Life Sciences
Soviet zoologists
Burials at Raadi cemetery